Zoe Pound is a criminal street gang based in Miami, Florida founded by Haitian immigrants in the mid-1990s.

Etymology
"Zoe'" is the anglicized variant of the word zo, Haitian Creole for "bone", as members were known to be "hard to the bone." When conflicts against Haitians arose, the pound would be sought out to retaliate; thus, the street gang name, "Zoe Pound", was born. "Pound" may also stand for "Power Of (the) Unified Negroes (in) Divinity".

History
Having branched out from Miami in the two decades leading up to 2010, they are known to be involved in drug trafficking and robbery and related violent crimes in support of their drug trafficking activities in Evansville, Indiana.

In 2004, six Zoe Pound leaders were arrested on racketeering and conspiracy charges in Fort Pierce, Florida after Florida Department of Law Enforcement offices convinced several gang members to give testimony for the prosecution.

References

Gangs in Florida
Haitian-American culture in Miami